Ruqayyah Boyer (Arab رقية born April 28, 1991) is a Surinamese-Guyanese actress, singer/songwriter/rapper and former beauty pageant titleholder. She is also a graduate of the Institute of creative arts (Theatre arts, Drama and Music)

Miss Guyana 2012
Boyer was crowned Miss Guyana 2012 by Leila Lopes Miss Universe 2011.

First runner-up in the pageant was Nikita Barker, second runner-up was Canadian-Guyanese Sadhna Yunus, and third runner-up was Nikesha Alexander.

Miss World Guyana 2013

Ruqayyah Boyer was chosen by the new franchise owner, Natasha Martindale as she is currently Miss Universe Guyana 2012, represented Guyana at Miss Universe 2012 in Las Vegas, Nevada and was a finalist in Miss World Guyana 2012.

References

External links
http://www.missworld.com/news/Talented-Guyana-alumna-continues-to-produce-audio-gold/
http://www.gtvibes.com/2016/07/ruqayyah-boyer-to-release-first-single-sunshine.html
http://www.592jamz.com/index.php/music/singles/item/1032-ruqayyah-boyer-sunshine-feat-kwasi-ace-kirsty-heslewood
http://guyanachronicle.com/2016/07/14/from-pageantry-to-making-sweet-music/
http://www.592jamz.com/index.php/music/singles/item/1068-ruqayyah-you-don-t-own-me
http://guyanachronicle.com/2016/10/06/ruqayyahs-you-dont-own-me-speaks-against-domestic-violence/
http://guyanachronicle.com/reigning-miss-world-guyana-takes-fight-to-domestic-violence-bullyism/
http://newssourcegy.com/entertainment/boyer-to-represent-guyana-at-miss-world/
http://www.guyanatimesgy.com/2014/09/05/boyer-to-represent-guyana-at-miss-international-pageant-in-japan/
http://www.caribnewsdesk.com/news/6479-miss-world-guyana-gets-new-york-award

1991 births
Living people
Guyanese beauty pageant winners
Guyanese people of Dutch descent
Surinamese emigrants to Guyana
Miss Universe 2012 contestants
Miss World 2013 delegates
Miss International 2014 delegates
Guyanese female models
People from Paramaribo